Lak Tarashan (also Romanized as Lāk Tarāshān) is a village in Mehravan Rural District, in the Central District of Neka County, Mazandaran Province, Iran. At the 2006 census, its population was 284, in 75 families.

References 

Populated places in Neka County